In mathematics, a series is the sum of the terms of an infinite sequence of numbers. More precisely, an infinite sequence  defines a series  that is denoted 

The th partial sum  is the sum of the first  terms of the sequence; that is,

A series is convergent (or converges) if the sequence  of its partial sums  tends to a limit; that means that, when adding one  after the other in the order given by the indices, one gets partial sums that become closer and closer to a given number. More precisely, a series converges, if there exists a number  such that for every arbitrarily small positive number , there is a (sufficiently large) integer  such that for all ,

If the series is convergent, the (necessarily unique) number  is called the sum of the series.

The same notation 

is used for the series, and, if it is convergent, to its sum.

Any series that is not convergent is said to be divergent or to diverge.

Examples of convergent and divergent series 

 The reciprocals of the positive integers produce a divergent series (harmonic series):
 
 Alternating the signs of the reciprocals of positive integers produces a convergent series (alternating harmonic series):

 The reciprocals of prime numbers produce a divergent series (so the set of primes is "large"; see divergence of the sum of the reciprocals of the primes):
 
 The reciprocals of triangular numbers produce a convergent series:
 
 The reciprocals of factorials produce a convergent series (see Euler's number):
 
 The reciprocals of square numbers produce a convergent series (the Basel problem):
 
 The reciprocals of powers of 2 produce a convergent series (so the set of powers of 2 is "small"):
 
 The reciprocals of powers of any n>1 produce a convergent series:
 
 Alternating the signs of reciprocals of powers of 2 also produces a convergent series:
 
 Alternating the signs of reciprocals of powers of any n>1 produces a convergent series:
 
 The reciprocals of Fibonacci numbers produce a convergent series (see ψ):

Convergence tests 

There are a number of methods of determining whether a series converges or diverges.

Comparison test. The terms of the sequence  are compared to those of another sequence .  If,
for all n, and  converges, then so does 

However,
if, for all n, and  diverges, then so does 

Ratio test. Assume that for all n,  is not zero.  Suppose that there exists  such that

If r < 1, then the series is absolutely convergent.  If  then the series diverges.  If  the ratio test is inconclusive, and the series may converge or diverge.

Root test or  nth root test. Suppose that the terms of the sequence in question are non-negative.  Define r as follows:

where "lim sup" denotes the limit superior (possibly ∞; if the limit exists it is the same value).

If r < 1, then the series converges.  If  then the series diverges.  If  the root test is inconclusive, and the series may converge or diverge.

The ratio test and the root test are both based on comparison with a geometric series, and as such they work in similar situations.  In fact, if the ratio test works (meaning that the limit exists and is not equal to 1) then so does the root test; the converse, however, is not true.  The root test is therefore more generally applicable, but as a practical matter the limit is often difficult to compute for commonly seen types of series.

Integral test. The series can be compared to an integral to establish convergence or divergence.  Let  be a positive and monotonically decreasing function.  If

then the series converges.  But if the integral diverges, then the series does so as well.

Limit comparison test. If , and the limit  exists and is not zero, then  converges if and only if  converges.

Alternating series test. Also known as the Leibniz criterion, the alternating series test states that for an alternating series of the form , if  is monotonically decreasing, and has a limit of 0 at infinity, then the series converges.

Cauchy condensation test. If  is a positive monotone decreasing sequence, then
 converges if and only if  converges.

Dirichlet's test

Abel's test

Conditional and absolute convergence 

For any sequence ,  for all n. Therefore,

This means that if  converges, then  also converges (but not vice versa).

If the series  converges, then the series  is absolutely convergent.  The Maclaurin series of the exponential function is absolutely convergent for every complex value of the variable.

If the series  converges but the series  diverges, then the series  is conditionally convergent.

The Riemann series theorem states that if a series converges conditionally, it is possible to rearrange the terms of the series in such a way that the series converges to any value, or even diverges.

Uniform convergence 

Let  be a sequence of functions.  
The series  is said to converge uniformly to f
if the sequence  of partial sums defined by

 

converges uniformly to f.

There is an analogue of the comparison test for infinite series of functions called the Weierstrass M-test.

Cauchy convergence criterion 

The Cauchy convergence criterion states that a series

converges if and only if the sequence of partial sums is a Cauchy sequence.
This means that for every  there is a positive integer  such that for all  we have

which is equivalent to

See also
 Normal convergence
 List of mathematical series

External links
 
 Weisstein, Eric (2005). Riemann Series Theorem. Retrieved May 16, 2005.

Mathematical series
Convergence (mathematics)